Bengt Morten Wenstøb (born 26 February 1963) is a Norwegian politician for the Conservative Party. He was elected to the Parliament of Norway from Østfold in 2013 where he is member of the Standing Committee on Labour and Social Affairs.

References 

Conservative Party (Norway) politicians
Members of the Storting
Østfold politicians
1963 births
Living people
21st-century Norwegian politicians